Simbal is a 22 different types of rajput village/hamlet in Baijnath tehsil, Kangra District of Himachal Pradesh, India. It comes under Simbal Panchayath. It is located 33 km to the east of the district headquarters Dharamshala and 141 km from the State capital Shimla.

Geography
The village is located on the right bank of the river Binwa, a corrupt form of ancient Binduka, a tributary of the Beas River. The average elevation of the area is 1301 meters.

Demographics
The local languages are Hindi and Kangri.

Place of worship
Mahadev gufa mandir is one of the ancient Hindu temples dedicated to Lord Shiva and two another temple of lord shiva.

Villages in Kangra district